The Porte Saint-Martin is a Parisian monument located at the site of one of the gates of the now-destroyed fortifications of Paris. It is located at the crossing of Rue Saint-Martin, Rue du Faubourg Saint-Martin and the grands boulevards Boulevard Saint-Martin and Boulevard Saint-Denis.

History 

The Porte Saint-Martin was designed by architect Pierre Bullet (a student of François Blondel, architect of the nearby Porte Saint-Denis) at the order of Louis XIV in honor of his victories on the Rhine and in Franche-Comté.  Built in 1674, it replaced a medieval gate in the city walls built by Charles V.  It was restored in 1988.

Description 

The Porte Saint-Martin is a heavily rusticated triumphal arch, 18 meters high, built in limestone and marble. Recesses are occupied by bas-reliefs:

North side left: La Prise du Limbourg en 1675 (The Capture of Limbourg) by Pierre Le Gros the Elder, a sitting woman next to a lion
North side right: La Défaite des Allemands (The Defeat of the Germans) by Gaspard Marsy, Louis XIV as Mars carrying the shield of France and pushing back a German eagle to protect a woman and an old man
South side left: La Rupture de la Triple Alliance (The Breaking of the Triple Alliance) by Étienne le Hongre, Louis XIV as Hercules, partly nude
South side right: La prise de Besançon (The Capture of Besançon) by Martin van den Bogaert, Louis XIV dressed as Fame, standing in front of an olive tree and receiving keys from a woman

Access

See also 
 Porte Saint-Denis
 List of post-Roman triumphal arches

External links 

Insecula - Porte Saint-Martin 

Terminating vistas in Paris
Triumphal arches in France
Monuments and memorials in Paris
Buildings and structures completed in 1674
Saint-Martin
Buildings and structures in the 10th arrondissement of Paris